Ballyoan Cemetery is a cemetery in Derry, Northern Ireland.

Ballyoan Cemetery is located on a hillside off the Rossdowney Road, Waterside, Derry. It looks out over the River Foyle and the city towards the Donegal Mountains. This cemetery was planned due to the fulness of the City Cemetery and the Altnagelvin Cemetery (instituted 1960).

In the mid-1990s, over 400 human remains were found at the Waterside Workhouse, Derry Workhouse. These remains, believed to be of people who died during the Famine, were later interred in this cemetery.

This cemetery is not segregated like many others.

Derry City Council planned and built a Temple of Rest, on site but later changed its purpose to a Cemetery Caretaker's residence and then to a storage facility for Council equipment. It is now empty and redundant.

References

External links
 

Cemeteries in Northern Ireland
Derry (city)